Courthouse Center is a government office tower in Downtown Miami, Florida, United States. The Courthouse Center was built in 1986 and contains 100% office space. It has 30 floors, and is 405 ft (123 m) tall. The building's architecture is distinctly similar to Southeast Financial Center. The building is located in the Government Center district, on Northwest 1st Avenue. It is located in the western edge of Downtown.

See also
List of tallest buildings in Miami

References

External links

Courthouse Center

Skyscraper office buildings in Miami
Government buildings in Florida
Government buildings completed in 1986
Office buildings completed in 1986
1980s architecture in the United States
1986 establishments in Florida